Ras al-Ayn, also spelled Ras al-Ain, is a city in al-Hasakah Governorate in northeastern Syria, on the Syria–Turkey border.

One of the oldest cities in Upper Mesopotamia, the area of Ras al-Ayn has been inhabited since at least the Neolithic age ( 8,000 BC). Later known as the ancient Aramean city of Sikkan, the Roman city of Rhesaina, and the Byzantine city of Theodosiopolis, the town was destroyed and rebuilt several times, and in medieval times was the site of fierce battles between several Muslim dynasties. With the 1921 Treaty of Ankara, Ras al-Ayn became a divided city when its northern part, today's Ceylanpınar, was ceded to Turkey.

With a population of 29,347, it is the third largest city in al-Hasakah Governorate, and the administrative center of Ras al-Ayn District.

During the civil war, the city became contested between Syrian opposition forces and YPG from November 2012 until it was finally captured by the YPG in July 2013. It was later captured by the Turkish Armed Forces and the Syrian National Army during the 2019 Turkish offensive into north-eastern Syria.

Etymology 
The first mention of the town is in Akkadian  during the reign of the Assyrian king Adad-nirari II (911-891 BC). The Arabic name Ras al-Ayn is a literal translation of the Akkadian name and has the same meaning; "head of the spring", or idiomatically, "hill of the spring", indicating a prominent mountain formation close to a well.

The ancient Greek geographer Ptolemy (d. 168) names the town Raisena. The town, as part of the Roman Empire, was called Ressaina/Resaina. Another name was Theodosiopolis, after emperor Theodosius I, who enlarged the town in 380. The 11th century Arab geographer Muhammad al-Idrisi visited the town, mentioning its name as Ras al-'Ayn, and assigning it to Diyar Rabi'a (abode of the Arab tribe Rabi'a). He also described it as a big city with plenty of water, around 300 springs from which most of al-Khabur river starts. In addition to Ras al-Ayn, medieval Arab Muslim sources refer to the town sometimes as Ain Werda. Nineteenth-century English sources refer to the town as Ras Ain, Ain Verdeh (1819), or Ras el Ain (1868). The Kurdish name  also means "head of the spring" or "head of the fountain", referring to water source areas. This name is probably a modern literal translation of the ancient Semitic name.

Geography and climate 

Ras al-Ayn is located in the Upper Khabur basin in the northern Syrian region of Jazira. The overground feeders, originating on the headwaters of the Karaca volcano in Şanlıurfa Province, usually do not carry water in the summer, even though Turkey brings in water from the Atatürk reservoir to irrigate the region of Ceylanpınar. While more than 80% of the Upper Khabur's water originates in Turkey, this mostly comes as underground flow. So rather than the overground streams, it is the giant karstic springs of the Ras al-Ayn area that is considered the river's main perennial source.

Ras al-Ayn springs 
Ras al-Ayn has more than 100 natural springs. The most famous spring is Nab'a al-Kebreet, a hot spring with a very high mineral content, containing calcium, lithium, and radium.

Water supply 
The Allouk water pumping station, which distributes water to the Hasakah Governorate, is close to Ras al-Ayn. Since the Turkish occupation began, the water supply has been interrupted several times. Previously, the station supplied about 460,000 people in Al-Hasakah, Tell Tamer, and the Al-Hawl refugee camp, but not since the last interruption in March 2020, according to the United Nations High Commissioner for Refugees.

History

Neolithic and ancient history 

The area of Ras al-Ayn was inhabited at least since the Neolithic age (c. 8.000 BC). Today's Ras al-Ayn can be traced back to a settlement existing since c. 2000 BC, which in the early 1st millennium BC became the ancient city of Sikkan, part of the Aramaean kingdom of Bit Bahiani. The archaeological site is located on the southern edge of the mound Tell Fekheriye, around which today's Ras al-Ayn is built, just a few hundred meters south of the city center. During excavations in 1979, the famous Tell Fekheriye bilingual inscription was found. The nearby town of Tell Halaf is also a former site of an Aramean city.

Classical era
In later times, the town became known as "Rhesaina", "Ayn Warda", and "Theodosiopolis", the latter named after the Byzantine emperor Theodosius I who granted the settlement city rights. The latter name was also shared with the Armenian city of Karin (modern Erzurum) making it difficult to distinguish between them.

The Sasanians destroyed the city twice in 578 and 580 before rebuilding it and constructing one of the three Sassanian academies in it (the other two being Gundishapur and Ctesiphon) in it.

Medieval history 
The city fell to the Arabs in 640 who confiscated parts of the city which were abandoned by their inhabitants. The Byzantines raided the city in 942 and took many prisoners. In 1129, Crusader Joscelin I managed to hold the city briefly, killing many of its Arab inhabitants.

At its height the city had a West Syrian bishopric and many monasteries. The city also contained two mosques and an East Syrian church and numerous schools, baths, and gardens.

Ras al-Ayn became contested between the Zengids, Ayyubids, and the Khwarazmians in the 12th and 13th centuries. It was sacked by Tamerlane at the end of the 14th century, ending its role as a major city in al-Jazira.

Ottoman history 
In the 19th century a colony of Muslim Chechen refugees fleeing the Russian conquest of the Caucasus were settled in the town by the Ottoman Empire. The Ottomans also built barracks and a fort for a thousand soldiers to control and protect the refugees.

During the Armenian genocide, Ras al-Ayn was one of the major collecting points for deported Armenians. From 1915 on, 1.5 million Armenians were deported from all over Anatolia, many forced on death marches into the Syrian desert. Approximately 80,000 Armenians, mostly women and children, were slaughtered in desert death camps near Ras al-Ayn. As well as the Deir ez-Zor Camps further south, the Ras al-Ayn Camps became "synonymous with Armenian suffering."

Modern history 

After the fall of the Ottoman Empire and the 1921 Treaty of Ankara, Ras al-Ayn became a divided city when its northern neighborhoods, today's Ceylanpınar, were ceded to Turkey. Today, the two cities are separated by a fenced border strip and the Berlin–Baghdad Railway on the Turkish side. The only border crossing is located in the western outskirts of Ras al-Ayn. The town was first part of the French colonial empire's Mandate for Syria and the Lebanon and, from 1946, the independent state of Syria.

Civil War

During the civil war, Ras al-Ayn was engulfed by the long Battle of Ras al-Ayn. In late November 2012, rebels of al-Nusra Front and the FSA attacked Syrian Army positions, expelling them from the town. During the following eight months, the Kurdish-majority People's Protection Units (YPG), present from the outset, gradually entrenched its position, and eventually formed an alliance with a non-jihadist FSA faction. On 21 July 2013, this alliance expelled the jihadists after a night of heavy fighting.

The town was part of Rojava for the following six years, until it was attacked and captured by the Turkish army and allied Syrian National Army during the October 2019 Turkish offensive into north-eastern Syria, in the Second Battle of Ras al-Ayn. After 11 days of clashes and siege, the Syrian Democratic Forces retreated from Ras al-Ayn as part of a ceasefire agreement.

Bombings
On December 10, 2020, a car bomb exploded at a checkpoint run by Turkish-supported Syrian National Army rebels in Ras al-Ayn. Reports on casualties differed, but according to several sources the explosion killed over 10 people including 2 Turkish soldiers. Turkish authorities blamed the Peoples Protection Units (YPG) for the car bombing as Turkey claims they are affiliated with the Kurdistan Workers Party (PKK). According the ABC, no group has claimed responsibility for the bombing.

Bombing continued in January and February 2021.

Demographics

In 2004 the population was 29,347. The town has been described as having an Arab majority, in addition to Kurdish, Assyrian, Armenian, Turkmen and Chechens minorities before the Turkish/SNA takeover in October 2019. War crimes committed since the Turkish occupation began have since caused an exodus of Kurds, Christians, and other minorities from the town. The Turkish government's resettling of mainly Arab Syrian refugees from other parts of Syria in Ras al-Ayn has further altered the town's demographics.

Churches in the town
 Syriac Orthodox Church of Saint Thomas the Apostle (كنيسة مار توما الرسول للسريان الأرثوذكس)
 Syriac Catholic Church of Mary Magdalene (كنيسة مريم المجدلية للسريان الكاثوليك)
 Armenian Orthodox Church of Saint Hagop (كنيسة القديس هاكوب للارمن الارثوذكس)

See also
Battle of Ras al-Ayn
Second Battle of Ras al-Ayn (2019)
Ras al-Ayn camps

References

External links

Divided cities on the Turkish-Syrian border
Kurdish communities in Syria
Assyrian communities in Syria
Armenian communities in Syria
Circassian communities in Syria